In ring theory, a branch of abstract algebra, an idempotent element or simply idempotent of a ring is an element a such that . That is, the element is idempotent under the ring's multiplication. Inductively then, one can also conclude that  for any positive integer n. For example, an idempotent element of a matrix ring is precisely an idempotent matrix.

For general rings, elements idempotent under multiplication are involved in decompositions of modules, and connected to homological properties of the ring. In Boolean algebra, the main objects of study are rings in which all elements are idempotent under both addition and multiplication.

Examples

Quotients of Z 
One may consider the ring of integers modulo n where n is squarefree. By the Chinese remainder theorem, this ring factors into the product of rings of integers modulo p where p is prime. Now each of these factors is a field, so it is clear that the factors' only idempotents will be 0 and 1. That is, each factor has two idempotents. So if there are m factors, there will be 2m idempotents.

We can check this for the integers mod 6, .  Since 6 has two prime factors (2 and 3) it should have 22 idempotents.

 02 ≡ 0 ≡ 0 (mod 6)
 12 ≡ 1 ≡ 1 (mod 6)
 22 ≡ 4 ≡ 4 (mod 6)
 32 ≡ 9 ≡ 3  (mod 6)
 42 ≡ 16 ≡ 4 (mod 6)
 52 ≡ 25 ≡ 1 (mod 6)

From these computations, 0, 1, 3, and 4 are idempotents of this ring, while 2 and 5 are not. This also demonstrates the decomposition properties described below: because , there is a ring decomposition .  In 3Z/6Z the identity is 3+6Z and in 4Z/6Z the identity is 4+6Z.

Quotient of polynomial ring 
Given a ring  and an element  such that , then the quotient ring

has the idempotent .

Idempotents in split-quaternion rings 
There is a catenoid of idempotents in the split-quaternion ring.

Types of ring idempotents
A partial list of important types of idempotents includes:
Two idempotents a and b are called orthogonal if .
An idempotent a in R is called a central idempotent if  for all x in R, that is, if a is in the center of R.
A trivial idempotent refers to either of the elements 0 and 1, which are always idempotent.
A primitive idempotent of a ring R is a nonzero idempotent a such that aR is indecomposable as a right R-module; that is, such that aR is not a direct sum of two nonzero submodules. Equivalently, a is a primitive idempotent if it cannot be written as a = e + f, where e and f are nonzero orthogonal idempotents in R.
A local idempotent is an idempotent a such that aRa is a local ring.  This implies that aR is directly indecomposable, so local idempotents are also primitive.
A right irreducible idempotent is an idempotent a for which aR is a simple module.  By Schur's lemma,  is a division ring, and hence is a local ring, so right (and left) irreducible idempotents are local.
A centrally primitive idempotent is a central idempotent a that cannot be written as the sum of two nonzero orthogonal central idempotents.
An idempotent  in the quotient ring R/I is said to lift modulo I if there is an idempotent b in R such that .
An idempotent a of R is called a full idempotent if .
A separability idempotent; see separable algebra.

Any non-trivial idempotent a is a zero divisor (because  with neither a nor b being zero, where ). This shows that integral domains and division rings do not have such idempotents. Local rings also do not have such idempotents, but for a different reason. The only idempotent contained in the Jacobson radical of a ring is 0.

Rings characterized by idempotents
A ring in which all elements are idempotent is called a Boolean ring. Some authors use the term "idempotent ring" for this type of ring. In such a ring, multiplication is commutative and every element is its own additive inverse. 
A ring is semisimple if and only if every right (or every left) ideal is generated by an idempotent.
A ring is von Neumann regular if and only if every finitely generated right (or every finitely generated left) ideal is generated by an idempotent.
A ring for which the annihilator r.Ann(S) every subset S of R is generated by an idempotent is called a Baer ring. If the condition only holds for all singleton subsets of R, then the ring is a right Rickart ring. Both of these types of rings are interesting even when they lack a multiplicative identity.
A ring in which all idempotents are central is called an Abelian ring.  Such rings need not be commutative.
A ring is directly irreducible if and only if 0 and 1 are the only central idempotents.
A ring is called an SBI ring or Lift/rad ring if all idempotents of R lift modulo the Jacobson radical.
A ring satisfies the ascending chain condition on right direct summands if and only if the ring satisfies the descending chain condition on left direct summands if and only if every set of pairwise orthogonal idempotents is finite.
If a is idempotent in the ring R, then aRa is again a ring, with multiplicative identity a.  The ring aRa is often referred to as a corner ring of R.  The corner ring arises naturally since the ring of endomorphisms .

Role in decompositions
The idempotents of R have an important connection to decomposition of R-modules. Clearly then, M is directly indecomposable if and only if 0 and 1 are the only idempotents in E.

In the case when  the endomorphism ring , where each endomorphism arises as left multiplication by a fixed ring element. Thus every direct summand of R is generated by an idempotent.

If a is a central idempotent, then the corner ring  is a ring with multiplicative identity a. Just as idempotents determine the direct decompositions of R as a module, the central idempotents of R determine the decompositions of R as a direct sum of rings. If R is the direct sum of the rings R1,...,Rn, then the identity elements of the rings Ri are central idempotents in R, pairwise orthogonal, and their sum is 1. Conversely, given central idempotents a1,...,an in R that are pairwise orthogonal and have sum 1, then R is the direct sum of the rings Ra1,…,Ran. As a result, a ring R is directly indecomposable as a ring if and only if the identity 1 is centrally primitive.

Working inductively, one can attempt to decompose 1 into a sum of centrally primitive elements.  If 1 is centrally primitive, we are done.  If not, it is a sum of central orthogonal idempotents, which in turn are primitive or sums of more central idempotents, and so on.  The problem that may occur is that this may continue without end, producing an infinite family of central orthogonal idempotents. The condition "R does not contain infinite sets of central orthogonal idempotents" is a type of finiteness condition on the ring.  It can be achieved in many ways, such as requiring the ring to be right Noetherian.  If a decomposition  exists with each ci a centrally primitive idempotent, then R is a direct sum of the corner rings ci&hairsp;Rci, each of which is ring irreducible.

For associative algebras or Jordan algebras over a field, the Peirce decomposition is a decomposition of an algebra as a sum of eigenspaces of commuting idempotent elements.

Relation with involutions
If a is an idempotent of the endomorphism ring EndR(M), then the endomorphism  is an R-module involution of M. That is, f is an R-module homomorphism such that f 2 is the identity endomorphism of M.

An idempotent element a of R and its associated involution f gives rise to two involutions of the module R, depending on viewing R as a left or right module. If r represents an arbitrary element of R, f can be viewed as a right R-module homomorphism  so that , or f can also be viewed as a left R-module homomorphism , where .

Thus for a ring in which 2 is invertible, the idempotent elements correspond to involutions in a one-to-one manner.

Category of R-modules
Lifting idempotents also has major consequences for the category of R-modules. All idempotents lift modulo I if and only if every R direct summand of R/I has a projective cover as an R-module.  Idempotents always lift modulo nil ideals and rings for which R is I-adically complete.

Lifting is most important when , the Jacobson radical of R.  Yet another characterization of semiperfect rings is that they are semilocal rings whose idempotents lift modulo J(R).

Lattice of idempotents
One may define a partial order on the idempotents of a ring as follows: if a and b are idempotents, we write  if and only if . With respect to this order, 0 is the smallest and 1 the largest idempotent. The atoms of this partial order are precisely the primitive idempotents. 

When the above partial order is restricted to the central idempotents of R, a lattice structure, or even a Boolean algebra structure, can be given.  For two central idempotents e and f the complement   and the join and meet  are given by 
e ∨ f = e + f − ef
and  
e ∧ f = ef.
It is shown in  that if R is von Neumann regular and right self-injective, then the lattice is a complete lattice.

Notes 
Idempotent and nilpotent were introduced by Benjamin Peirce in 1870.

References 

 “idempotent” at FOLDOC

  p. 443
 Peirce, Benjamin.. Linear Associative Algebra 1870.

Ring theory